Enrico Bandini (September 13, 1807 – February 27, 1888) was an Italian painter, active in Parma, Italy.

He trained in his native Parma, at the city's Academy of Fine Arts under Giovanni Tebaldi. He painted both portraits and sacred subjects. He painted a Supper at Emmaus for the church of Sala Baganza. He died in Parma.

References

1807 births
1888 deaths
19th-century Italian painters
Italian male painters
Painters from Parma
19th-century Italian male artists